In geometry, the rhombitetrahexagonal tiling is a uniform tiling of the hyperbolic plane. It has Schläfli symbol of rr{6,4}. It can be seen as constructed as a rectified tetrahexagonal tiling, r{6,4}, as well as an expanded order-4 hexagonal tiling or expanded order-6 square tiling.

Constructions 
There are two uniform constructions of this tiling, one from [6,4] or (*642) symmetry, and secondly removing the mirror middle, [6,1+,4], gives a rectangular fundamental domain [∞,3,∞], (*3222).

There are 3 lower symmetry forms seen by including edge-colorings:  sees the hexagons as truncated triangles, with two color edges, with [6,4+] (4*3) symmetry.  sees the yellow squares as rectangles, with two color edges, with [6+,4] (6*2) symmetry. A final quarter symmetry combines these colorings, with [6+,4+] (32×) symmetry, with 2 and 3 fold gyration points and glide reflections.

Symmetry 
The dual tiling, called a deltoidal tetrahexagonal tiling, represents the fundamental domains of the *3222 orbifold, shown here from three different centers. Its fundamental domain is a Lambert quadrilateral, with 3 right angles. This symmetry can be seen from a [6,4], (*642) triangular symmetry with one mirror removed, constructed as [6,1+,4], (*3222). Removing half of the blue mirrors doubles the domain again into *3322 symmetry.

Related polyhedra and tiling

See also

Square tiling
Tilings of regular polygons
List of uniform planar tilings
List of regular polytopes

References
 John H. Conway, Heidi Burgiel, Chaim Goodman-Strass, The Symmetries of Things 2008,  (Chapter 19, The Hyperbolic Archimedean Tessellations)

External links 

 Hyperbolic and Spherical Tiling Gallery
 KaleidoTile 3: Educational software to create spherical, planar and hyperbolic tilings
 Hyperbolic Planar Tessellations, Don Hatch

Hyperbolic tilings
Isogonal tilings
Uniform tilings